My Soul is the third studio album by rapper Coolio, released on August 26, 1997 and was his last album for Tommy Boy Records.  Production was handled by Romeo, Vic C., Bryan "Wino" Dobbs and DJ I-Roc. The album has been certified gold by the RIAA.

Critical reception

AllMusic's Stephen Thomas Erlewine said that despite lacking a single as memorable as "Gangsta's Paradise", he praised the album for remaining consistent with the formula used from the previous two efforts by providing a more "elaborate production" with lesser known samples and string instrumentations, and Coolio for being steadfast in having both dramedy and ear-grabbing funk in his delivery, concluding that "[I]t's a small, subtle difference, but it's what makes My Soul a thoroughly enjoyable record, no matter if you're going out or staying in." Vibe contributor Malik R. Singleton praised the overall energy throughout the album and Coolio's "didactic delivery" displaying versatility ranging from "intense ("Nature of the Business") to inspirational ("Homeboy") but felt he crafted "too many witless hooks and too much predictable phrasing" on tracks like "Throwdown 2000" and "Let's Do It", concluding that "Despite its blatantly uneven ratio of rump-shaking fluff to heavy-hitting fly rhymes […] My Soul proves why Coolio's presence in hip hop's collective voice remains at least interesting: He's not afraid to have fun."

Commercial performance
Compared to Coolio's previous two albums, My Soul was only a minor success, making it to number 39 on the Billboard 200 and number 49 on the Top R&B/Hip-Hop Albums.

However, the album's only charting single, "C U When U Get There" did well, making it to number 12 on the Billboard Hot 100, number 7 on the Hot Rap Singles, number 19 on the Rhythmic Top 40, and number 11 on the Hot Dance Singles Sales. Internationally, it reached number 3 on the UK Singles Chart, and number 5 on the Canadian Singles Chart.

Track listing

Samples
"2 Minutes & 21 Seconds of Funk"
"The Payback" by James Brown
"C U When U Get There"
"Canon in D Major" by Johann Pachelbel
"Homeboy"
"Tonight Is the Night" by Betty Wright
"Friends" by Whodini
"Can I Get Down One Time"
"For Those Who Like to Groove" by Ray Parker Jr.
"Hit 'Em"
"Human Beat Box" by Fat Boys
"Let's Do It"
"Take Your Time (Do It Right)" by The S.O.S. Band
"Ooh La La"
"Pull Up to the Bumper" by Grace Jones
"The Devil is Dope"
"The Devil is Dope" by The Dramatics
"One Mo"
"She Talks to Me With Her Body" by Bar-Kays
"Rapper's Delight" by Sugarhill Gang
"Knight Fall"
"Hook and Sling - Part I" by Eddie Bo
"Public Enemy No. 1" by Public Enemy

Charts

Certifications

References

1997 albums
Coolio albums
Tommy Boy Records albums
G-funk albums
Gangsta rap albums by American artists